Hiram Bailey (12 July 1824 – 26 December 1896) was an American politician.

Bailey was born in Townsend, Erie County, Ohio, on 12 July 1824 to parents Benjamin and Philena Bailey. He married Martha A. Odgen, moved to Chickasaw County, Iowa, and became a farmer. Between 1874 and 1878, Bailey was a Republican member of the Iowa Senate, representing District 48. At the time, the district included Bremer and Howard as well as Chickasaw County. Bailey died on 26 December 1896.

References

Farmers from Iowa
19th-century American politicians
1824 births
1896 deaths
People from Chickasaw County, Iowa
People from Erie County, Ohio
Republican Party Iowa state senators